Horodok is a city in Khmelnytskyi Raion, Khmelnytskyi Oblast (province) of Ukraine. It hosts the administration of Horodok urban hromada, one of the hromadas of Ukraine. Its population was 17,746 according to the 2001 census. Current population is 

Until 18 July 2020, Horodok was the administrative center of Horodok Raion. The raion was abolished in July 2020 as part of the administrative reform of Ukraine, which reduced the number of raions of Khmelnytskyi Oblast to three. The area of Horodok Raion was merged into Khmelnytskyi Raion.

People from Horodok
 Clara Lemlich - American union organizer, suffragist
 Jan Paul Lenga - Priest, archbishop

Gallery

References

Cities in Khmelnytskyi Oblast
Cities of district significance in Ukraine
Podolia Voivodeship
Kamenets-Podolsky Uyezd